The vitelline arteries are the arterial counterpart to the vitelline veins. Like the veins, they play an important role in the vitelline circulation of blood to and from the yolk sac of a fetus. They are a branch of the dorsal aorta.

They give rise to the celiac artery, superior mesenteric artery, and inferior mesenteric artery.

References

External links
  
 https://web.archive.org/web/20070623132305/http://isc.temple.edu/marino/embryology/Heart98/heart_text.htm
 
 https://web.archive.org/web/20070915072304/http://www.ana.ed.ac.uk/database/humat/notes/extraemb/yolksac/vitart.htm
 http://www.med.umich.edu/lrc/coursepages/M1/embryology/embryo/13cardiovascular_system.htm
 https://web.archive.org/web/20070812190309/http://www.med.mun.ca/anatomyts/embryo/emb6.htm

Embryology of cardiovascular system